Initia Hasselt is a handball club from Hasselt, Belgium. They currently compete in the Belgian First Division.

Crest, colours, supporters

Kits

External links
 Official website
 EHF Profile

Belgian handball clubs